The House Committee (Malay: Jawatankuasa Dewan; ; Tamil: மலேசிய ஹவுஸ் ஆஃப் காமன்ஸ் ஹவுஸ் கமிட்டி) is a select committee of the House of Representatives in the Parliament of Malaysia. The remit of the committee is to advise the Chair on all matters related to all the conveniences, services and privileges of the House.

Membership

14th Parliament
As of December 2019, the members of the committee are as follows:

Former members of the committee are as follows:

See also
Parliamentary Committees of Malaysia

Notes

References

External links
HOUSE COMMITTEE

Parliament of Malaysia
Committees of the Parliament of Malaysia
Committees of the Dewan Rakyat